Horticulture Netting or Vegetable Support Net

Origin

Starting in the 1960s, in Europe a new rigid mesh and net product made out of polypropylene started being used.  The most famous factories were located in England and Italy, given the fact that these two countries where the most advanced in machine tooling and extrusion, then with the passing of time this technology found its way into other parts of the world, and today it is very easy to find  who manufactures this type of base product anywhere in the world

Stretching and Molecular Orientation
Once the semi-finished extruded product is ready (in this phase it is when colors and UV stabilizers are added to the PP mix), the product is passed thru a stretching section, this is where the strength and other mechanical properties are given as the polymer molecules are aligned. The net is first oriented longitudinally in hot water and then transversally in a ramose. The final result is a net with a lot of tensile strength (between 50 and 70 kg per meter) that weighs between 6 and 9 grams per square meter, and a mesh size that may reach up to 30x30 cm  according to the technical capacity of the manufacturer.

Available Sizes
Smaller mesh sizes (between 10 and 18 cm) are usually used for horizontal tutoring of flowers, especially carnations, mums and snaps, because in floriculture growers prefer an opening that will support vertically the flower without letting it tilt or bend because it would lose its commercial value. Larger sized meshes are preferred for vegetable support. especially cucurbits, solanaceae and legumes. The reason horticulturalists prefer a larger mesh size (which simulates the hand weaved raffia systems) is so one can work the two furrows on both sides of the walking isle, without damaging the crop or the plant during harvesting or trimming work.

Floriculture
Flower support netting is installed in many layers over the flower bed.  At the extremes of the furrow a net fastening and support system is installed so that the mesh can be stretched tightly over the growing flowers.  In between the two extremities of the flower bed, intermediate supports are necessary as to insure that mesh openings lay on top of each other's symmetrically and layer after layer so that flowers may grow straight.

Horticulture
The great majority of horticultural applications of plant support netting are vertical, even though there are also great horizontal uses.   When it is used vertically to provide support to the vegetable trellis, the netting is fastened to a line of posts or supports (metal, bamboo or wood) distanced from 1.5 to up to 8 meters (depending to the type of crop, soil type, climate etc.) where the furrow ends have posts that are larger and stronger and preferably have a tension string or twine on top that is anchored on both sides of the furrow and tensioned in between posts.

Once the posts are installed (in many cases where the farmer decides for a bit of extra support by installing a tension string on the top of the poles) one may proceed with the installation of the trellis netting, unrolling the net from post to post and fastening it both to the post.  This task takes about two workers per hectare per day.  It is advisable to install the netting before transplanting plants from the nursery trays or just a few days after the seed went in the ground so that plants are not damaged during installation of the support net.

Depending on the type of crop and plant to be trellised one can use netting of many different heights (these vary from 50 cm to up to more than 3 meters for use in greenhouses or shade house).  When choosing the height of the vegetable trellis netting one should keep in mind that the net should be installed 30–40 cm above the soil.  So a net 1.5 in height will provide a trellis or espalier between 1.80 and 1.90 m (so the post sizes should be around 2.2 and 2.5 m), and this would be the ideal support system measurement for most cucumber open field varieties.  The ideal size for square mesh is approx. 25x25 cm.

Inside a greenhouse this netting could be attached to the existing aerial structure and left hanging down to the furrows, this type of installation can call for a net that is 3 meters high, this net size is ideal for many hybrids species.
It is also worth mentioning the use of a large mesh tutoring net (for example the 25x25cm size) installed horizontally over tomatoes or peppers in open field, using a support system similar to the one used in flowers.  In such a system, the plant grows in between the meshes and the branches loaded with fruits will lean passively over the meshes completely eliminating the need for further labor in fastening and tying operations.

Phytosanitary Conditions
Climate Change is causing many great damages in agriculture. Strong out of season rains are forcing many traditionally "on ground" cultivation methods like the ones used for cucumbers or melons to be now grown on trellises vertically so to improve aeration and solar exposure of the foliage thus reducing the rate of mycosis attacks caused by humidity trapped between the solid and the leaf system, further avoiding direct solid contact of the fruit since this would develop spots on the vegetables thus reducing their market value.

Another important aspect to be considered when deciding the type of plant support for vegetables is the rate of mechanical transmission of viruses (for example mosaic virus) via the hands of the workers.  No matter how many precautions a grower may take to keep a high standard of sanitization in the fields (clothes change, washing hands in milk or stepping the shoes on a clorox trap) all one needs to lose control over the virus is for one worker to handle a cigarette or to touch an infected plant to   begin the exponential contagion rate in the whole field as if it were any aphids or trips.  For this reason, contrary to the raffia tutoring system where a lot of labor is required to tie by hand the plant to the twine during many phases of growth, the use of horticulture netting diminished a great deal for the need of a worker to walk the furrows handling the plants, thus reducing the possibility of spreading the disease.

Cucurbitaceae naturally seek the closest support point, and the netting offers multiple support points for the trellising needs of the plant thanks to the square mesh structure.  Also in the case of solanaceae (especially tomatoes or peppers) one can achieve a great reduction of hand labor by installing the net on both sides of the plant (or as a V shape) all along the furrow, creating sort of a sandwich system that holds the plant on both sides, allowing new branches to lean on the mesh without the need to spend money of labor otherwise needed to fasten and tie the plant to the structure.

Vertical Tutoring Tips
Each time a plant is handled, pruned or tied to the support system it will cause a few days of stress.  During this re-adjustment period, instead of feeding its fruits at full efficiency, the plant will send its nutrients to the foliage so that it can reposition itself efficiently (there are mathematical models that prove the efficiency of the natural leaves alignment to the sun).  During the pruning work and manual guidance of the plant, we increase the risk of contagion, especially virus, due to the handling of the workers, whom without knowing, could be transmitting a pathogen mechanically from plant to plant like any harmful insect.

Cultivating the type of determined bushy plants, like eggplant, tomato, chili and peppers, many growers decided to guide/tutor their plants with two "walls" of netting, one on each side of the furrow, therefore creating a growing system where the branches will be supported on their own without any need for manual tutoring.  With this system, the lower string of the bottom mesh nearest the soil on one side of the plant is tied gently (leaving about 4–10 cm, 2-4 inches in between the two nets) with the lowest string on the other side (this job is done when the plant is about 40 cm in height, 16 inches).  As the plant keeps growing, the distance in between the two walls of net also keeps increasing (30–60 cm) so that  each higher branch will be supported by the nearest mesh and be able to reach full vegetative development.
      
By allowing the plant to grow at 360 degrees, and to fully express its vegetative vigor, it will allow any fumigation to reach vegetable matter and leaves far into the plant mass so that the chemical may attack the targeted pathogens effectively and therefore reduce the recurrence of diseases and further chemical uses.

RE-usable
In most cases trellising net made out of stretched polypropylene is re-usable, and will last many crop cycles.  The ideal technique to fully maximize the investment in the agricultural implements from the first cycle, and to amortize this cost over many crops (mulching, irrigation, posts, cables, filters, netting), is to alternate a cycle of solanaceae or cucurbitaceae with one of leguminous or some other nitrogen fixer.  Giving for granted that during the previous cycle there had been a good phytosanitary management, and that there are no harmful colonies of pests to the next crop, once may proceed—after the last fruits are harvested—with cutting the old plant still on the tutor net,   and while the old plant dries up one may place the seed of the next crop (or wait a few days and transplant directly what comes from the nursery once the old plant matter is removed from the trellis).  In a few days the old plant can be easily removed and re-incorporated into the soil.

How to recognize a good Trellising net

Polypropylene loses tensile and physical properties once recycled or after a prolonged solar exposure.  Virgin polypropylene and a good quality netting will be noticeable from the shines and gloss, while an extruded net containing recycled PP will be opaque and not reflect light as much.  Considering crop netting must support the weight of a plant and also resist to natural elements like wind and rain, it is advisable to make sure one pay attention to the product before installing a net that might cause the whole crop to fall to the ground.  One more detail to keep an eye on is the color of the netting.  White is advisable because it will be visible at all times of the day and prevent accidental cuts during pruning and harvesting, the same cannot be said about black or green nets that will tend to hide among the leaves, stems and fruits.

Advantages
Growing on a horticulture trellis increases plant density since each plant will find expansion surface vertically on the netting mesh.  As the plant grows vertically, besides the already mentioned benefits of increased aeration and sun exposure, the plant´s flowers and fruits are protected from accidental crushing due to the worker walking along the furrows. There is also a greater rate of flower pollination since the flowers are more exposed to insects as leaves will not tend to grow over flowers completely covering them.  By taking care of the plant from accidental damages one extends the life span of the plant and the increasing the number of fruits harvested during a longer period.

Regional Variances of the term 'Horticultural Netting'
Crop support net
Tomato netting
Cucumber net
Trellis net
Trellising net
Trellis netting
Flower support net
Tutoring net
Plant support mesh

Gallery

Bibliography
ERGONOMIA EN LAS OPERACIONES DE ENTUTORADO DE CULTIVOS EN INVERNADERO 
Poda y entutorado del tomate, Zoilo Serrano, Hojas Divulgadoras, Ministerio de Agricultura

References

Agronomy